KSAP-LP, "The Breeze", is a radio station in Port Arthur, Texas that broadcasts a talk and community information format, with a local approach that is free of political and corporate influences. The low-power FM outlet is owned and operated by Truth and Education Corporation.

See also
List of community radio stations in the United States

References

External links
 

Community radio stations in the United States
SAP